ReachOut.com is an internet service for young people that provides information, support and resources about mental health issues and enable them to develop resilience, increase coping skills, and facilitate help-seeking behaviour. The site contains information about issues affecting young people in the form of fact sheets, stories, podcasts and online forums.

History
ReachOut.com was launched in March 1998 as an initiative of Inspire Foundation (now known as ReachOut Australia) to help young people with their mental health. ReachOut.com has now expanded to the United States and Ireland.

ReachOut provides online support to young people going through tough times. It provides online resources like real stories and fact sheets which are written alongside young people, and a peer-support forum which is a space where young people can talk about mental health issues and receive support and help.

Site content

Writing style and tone
The majority of ReachOut is written in an informal tone to appeal to the younger audience. The writing is often broken up into smaller sections or contains lists, and is usually accompanied by an image.

Site authors
Young people play a key role in writing content and developing ReachOut. The service often partners with other health and community service organizations to provide accurate and current information. As the site is informational, users are referred to phone and web counselling services such as Kids Helpline and Lifeline.

Services Linked With ReachOut.com
Reach Out.com has expanded its website to include new services.

ReachOut Central
ReachOut Central is a "serious" game that works interactively to help young people explore how thinking, behaviour and feelings interact with each other. A series of real life scenarios allow users to discover how the way they think and feel can positively influence their behaviour (or vice versa) and the impact this has on the outcome of situations. The information provided in the game links with information provided on ReachOut.com through the format of tips and tricks and links to fact sheets.

On 17 September 2007 ReachOut Central launched as a full version game after a successful run with the pilot program with limited scenarios. The current version of the game allows for further expansion in additional scenarios that can be scripted and updated when new information is made available.

Within two weeks of launching ReachOut Central was nominated and eventually named as a winner in the Changemakers.net Why Games Matter Competition. The announcement of the win with two other games was made on 8 November 2007. The interactive game was the only Australian game nominated.

ReachOut Central also came runner-up in the Health Category of the Stockholm Challenge Awards for 2008. ReachOut Central was one of the 19 finalists chosen from across the world under the Health Category of the Awards. The Stockholm Challenge Awards is an international award that inspires and challenges the information and technology industries to create social and sustainable benefits for individuals and communities through their projects.

ReachOut Community Forum
The online forum lets young people share what is happening in their lives, in a safe environment moderated by staff and trained moderators.  The forums are not a counselling service but often help to refer young people to information and services. They are also a way for ReachOut.com users to connect to each other and find others they can share similar experiences with.

ReachOut Teachers' Network
Launched in April 2007, the ReachOut Teachers’ Network connects secondary school teachers with the ReachOut service by providing classroom lessons on issues that young people may face within the curriculum areas in schools.

ReachOut Pro
The ReachOut.com Professionals service targets professionals dealing with young people and mental health by providing an online source of information and resources. The provision of these resources aims to provide a way for a range of professionals to engage young people in the treatment and maintenance of better mental health outcomes.

ReachOut Youth Involvement
All of ReachOut Australia's programs have input from young people, all of whom are volunteers. ReachOut has over 100 Youth Ambassadors from around Australia, and it is these young people who have input to the development of the website, and activities in which ReachOut partakes. The work the young people undertake ranges from administration tasks in the central office, to presentations for the service and moderation of the ReachOut Community Forums.

ReachOut Parents
In May 2016 ReachOut introduced a new free online service for parents who want to help but would like to know more about topics such as bullying, self-esteem, anxiety, and social media. A recent study found that 70% of teenagers do not access support, and if they do, most will turn to their parents first. ReachOut Parents provides practical support to encourage effective communication between parents and young people aged 12–18 years.

Awards
 Gold Harold for Health & Medicine, Life Education 2013
 Best Not for Profit Site, SiteCore Site of the Year Awards (ANZ) 2013
  Inspire Foundation (ReachOut.com) awarded for excellence in suicide prevention within social media in 2014

See also
 Depression (mood)
 Eating disorder
 Health promotion
 Mental health
 Substance abuse prevention
 Youth health

External links 
 ReachOut.com
 ReachOut.com Professionals
 ReachOut Central
 About ReachOut Australia

References

Reach Out!
Mental health organisations in Australia